The 2019 FIVB Volleyball Men's Club World Championship was the 15th edition of the event. It was held in Betim, Brazil from 3 to 8 December 2019.

Cucine Lube Civitanova won their first title and Bruno Rezende was chosen to be MVP of the tournament.

Qualification

Squads

Venue

Pool standing procedure
 Number of matches won
 Match points
 Sets ratio
 Points ratio
 If the tie continues as per the points ratio between two teams, the priority will be given to the team which won the last match between them. When the tie in points ratio is between three or more teams, a new classification of these teams in the terms of points 1, 2 and 3 will be made taking into consideration only the matches in which they were opposed to each other.

Match won 3–0 or 3–1: 3 match points for the winner, 0 match points for the loser
Match won 3–2: 2 match points for the winner, 1 match point for the loser

Preliminary round
All times are Brasília Time (UTC−03:00).
|}

|}

Final round
All times are Brasília Time (UTC−03:00).

Semifinals
|}

3rd place match

|}

Final

|}

Final standing

Awards

Most Valuable Player
 Bruno Rezende (Cucine Lube Civitanova)
Best Setter
 Bruno Rezende (Cucine Lube Civitanova)
Best Outside Spikers
 Osmany Juantorena (Cucine Lube Civitanova)
 Facundo Conte (Sada Cruzeiro)

Best Middle Blockers
 Artem Volvich (Zenit Kazan)
 Robertlandy Simón (Cucine Lube Civitanova)
Best Opposite Spiker
 Evandro Guerra (Sada Cruzeiro)
Best Libero
 Fabio Balaso (Cucine Lube Civitanova)

See also
2019 FIVB Volleyball Women's Club World Championship

References

External links
Official website
Final Standing
Awards
Formula
Statistics

FIVB Volleyball Men's Club World Championship
FIVB Men's Club World Championship
FIVB Men's Club World Championship
2019 FIVB Men's Club World Championship
Sport in Minas Gerais
FIVB Volleyball Men's Club World Championship